Chamaelimnas ammon is a species of butterfly of the family Riodinidae. It is found in Guyana.

References

Riodinini
Butterflies described in 1777
Taxa named by Pieter Cramer